Imperial Energy Corporation plc is a wholly owned subsidiary of the Oil and Natural Gas Corporation which is under the ownership of  Ministry of Petroleum and Natural Gas of the Government of India operating in Siberia. It is British-based and headquartered in Leeds.

History
The business was founded in 2004. In 2007 it was first listed on the London Stock Exchange. The company was acquired by ONGC for $2.1 billion in January 2009.

Operations
Imperial Energy Corporation produces approximately 80% of its oil from Maiskoye field and 20% from Snezhnoye field in Tomsk region. The company had  an extraordinarily high exploration success rate under British management with exploration activity on all blocks, in particular block 80 to the north of the river Ob, where a significant new Cretaceous play was discovered in June 2008. However, recent exploration results under the new Indian management have been disappointing.  In addition, new investment aimed at boosting production has not materialised causing production levels to drop below targets.  The parent company ONGC have recently run into trouble with the Government over poor operational results, unpaid salaries, legal confrontations with staff and outsourcing of valuable contracts to foreign companies resulting in a warning that future projects involving ONGC depended on better results from this current project.

Imperial Energy have a large number of promising and previously undrilled structures in all blocks in addition to 3.5 billion barrels of reserves currently in the 3p or 'possible' category.  New exploration wells and seismic data are planned for 2010.

The company also constructs the third pipeline linking its Block 80, East of the Ob River, to Zavyalovo.

Subsidiaries
The company is currently operating through four subsidiaries:
 Allianceneftegaz
 Sevkazgra
 Sibinterneft
 Nord Imperial

The business is organised on a geographic basis:
 Tomsk Oblast of Western Siberia
 Kostanai in North Central Kazakhstan

References

External links
 

Companies based in Leeds
Companies formerly listed on the London Stock Exchange
British companies established in 2004
Oil and gas companies of the United Kingdom
Oil companies of Russia
Non-renewable resource companies established in 2004